This is a list of rivers of Argentina.

Longest Rivers

By drainage basin

This list is arranged by drainage basin, with respective tributaries indented under each larger stream's name. Rivers in the table above are in bold.

La Plata Basin
 Río de la Plata
 Uruguay River
 Gualeguaychú River
 Mocoretá River
 Miriñay River
 Aguapey River
 Pepiri-Guazu River
 Paraná River
 Arrecifes River
 Gualeguay River
 Nogoyá River
 Arroyo del Medio
 Saladillo Stream
 Ludueña Stream
 Carcarañá River
 Tercero River (Calamuchita River)
 Cuarto River (Saladillo River, Chocancharava River)
 Salado River (Salado del Norte, Juramento River, Pasaje River, Calchaquí River)
 Horcones River
 Urueña River
 Arenales River
 Rosario River
 Guasamayo River
 San Javier River
 Feliciano River
 Guayquiraró River
 Corriente River
 Paraná Miní River
 Tapenagá River
 Palometa River
 Santa Lucía River
 Negro River
 Guaycurú River
 Paraguay River
 Río de Oro
 Bermejo River (Teuco River)
 Bermejito River
 Dorado River
 Teuquito River
 Seco River
 San Francisco River
 Grande River
 Mojotoro River (Lavayén River)
 Pescado River
 Iruya River
 Río Grande de Tarija
 Itaú River
 Lipeo River
 Pilcomayo River
 Pilaya River (Bolivia)
 San Juan del Oro River (Bolivia)
 Río Grande de San Juan
 Urugua-í River
 Iguazu River
 San Antonio River
 Luján River
 Reconquista River
 Matanza River (Riachuelo)
 Samborombón Bay
 Samborombón River
 Salado River

Atlantic Ocean - Patagonia

 Quequén Grande River
 Sauce Grande River
 Naposta Stream
 Sauce Chico River
 Colorado River
 Desaguadero River (Salado River, Bermejo River, Vinchina River) (usually does not reach the Colorado)
 Atuel River
 Diamante River
 Tunuyán River
 San Juan River
 Mendoza River
 Tupungato River
 Castaño Viejo River
 Calingasta River
 Río de los Patos
 Blanco River
 Jáchal River
 Blanco River
 Huaco River
 Barrancas River
 Grande River
 Río Negro
 Neuquén River
 Agrio River
 Limay River
 Collón Curá River
 Aluminé River
 Chimehuin River
 Traful River
 Chubut River
 Chico River
 Senguerr River
 Mayo River
 Guenguel River
 Tecka River
 Chico River
 Deseado River
 Pinturas River
 Fénix Grande River
 Santa Cruz River
 Chico River
 Chalía River (Shehuen River)
 Belgrano River
 La Leona River
 Coig River (Coyle River)
 Pelque River
 Gallegos River
 Chico River
 Grande River
 Fuego River

Pacific Ocean (Argentina - Chile) 

 Futaleufú River
 Percey River
 Corintos River
Hua-Hum River
Mayer River
Palena River
Pico River
Puelo River
Simpson River
 Vizcachas River

Interior basins
 Carapari River
 Itiyuro River
 Tartagal River
 Salado River (Colorado River)
 Belén River
 Abaucán River
 Mar Chiquita (Córdoba)
 Dulce River
 Saladillo River
 Salí River
 Primero River (Suquía River)
 Cosquín River
 Segundo River (Xanaes River)
 Cruz del Eje River
 Conlara River
 Quinto River (Popopis River)
 Malargüe River

Alphabetically

 Abaucán River
 Agrio River
 Aguapey River
 Aluminé River
 Arenales River
 Arrecifes River
 Atuel River
 Azul River
 Barrancas River
 Belén River
 Belgrano River
 Bermejo River (Teuco River)
 Bermejito River
 Blanco River
 Blanco River (Río de los Patos)
 Calingasta River
 Carapari River
 Carcarañá River
 Castaño Viejo River
 Chalía River (Shehuen River)
 Chico River (Lower Chubut)
 Chico River (Upper Chubut)
 Chico River (Santa Cruz)
 Chico River (Gallegos)
 Chimehuin River
 Chubut River
 Coig River (Coyle River)
 Collón Curá River
 Colorado River
 Conlara River
 Corriente River
 Cosquín River
 Cruz del Eje River
 Cuarto River (Saladillo River, Chocancharava River)
 Desaguadero River (Salado River, Bermejo River, Vinchina River)
 Deseado River
 Diamante River
 Dorado River
 Dulce River
 Feliciano River
 Fénix Grande River
 Fuego River
 Futaleufú River
 Gallegos River
 Grande River
 Grande River (Jujuy)
 Grande River (Tierra del Fuego)
 Río Grande de San Juan
 Río Grande de Tarija
 Gualeguay River
 Gualeguaychú River
 Guasamayo River
 Guaycurú River
 Guayquiraró River
 Guenguel River
 Horcones River
 Huaco River
 Hua Hum River
 Iguazu River
 Iruya River
 Itaú River
 Itiyuro River
 Jáchal River
 La Leona River
 Limay River
 Lipeo River
 Ludueña Stream
 Luján River
 Malargüe River
 Manso River
 Matanza River (Riachuelo)
 Mayer River
 Mayo River
 Mendoza River
 Middle Stream
 Miriñay River
 Mocoretá River
 Mojotoro River (Lavayén River)
 Naposta Stream
 Río Negro
 Negro River
 Neuquén River
 Nogoyá River
 Palena River (Carrenleufú River, Corcovado River)
 Palometa River
 Paraguay River
 Paraná River
 Paraná River
 Pelque River
 Pepiri-Guazu River
 Pescado River
 Pico River
 Pilcomayo River
 Pinturas River
 Primero River (Suquía River)
 Puelo River
 Quequén Grande River
 Quinto River (Popopis River)
 Reconquista River
 Río de la Plata
 Río de los Patos
 Río de Oro
 Rosario River
 Saladillo River
 Saladillo Stream
 Salado River (Salado del Norte, Juramento River, Pasaje River, Calchaquí River)
 Salado River (Buenos Aires)
 Salado River (Colorado River)
 Salí River
 Samborombón River
 San Antonio River
 San Francisco River
 San Javier River
 San Juan River
 Santa Cruz River
 Santa Lucía River
 Sauce Chico River
 Sauce Grande River
 Seco River
 Segundo River (Xanaes River)
 Senguerr River
 Tapenagá River
 Tartagal River
 Tecka River
 Tercero River (Calamuchita River)
 Teuquito River
 Traful River
 Tunuyán River
 Tupungato River
 Turbio River
 Urueña River
 Urugua-í River
 Uruguay River
 Vizcachas River

See also 
 Water resources management in Argentina
 List of rivers of the Americas by coastline

References

 Rand McNally, The New International Atlas, 1993.
  GEOnet Names Server
 Argentina Province Maps

External links
 Hidrografía de Argentina in Spanish

Argentina

Rivers of Argentina